Kathy Shaidle (7 May 1964 – 9 January 2021) was a Canadian author, columnist, poet and blogger.  A self-described "anarcho-peacenik" in the early years of her writing career, she moved to a conservative, Roman Catholic position following the September 11 attacks, and entered the public eye as the author of the popular RelapsedCatholic blog. Citing some points of friction with her faith, Shaidle relaunched her blogging career under her FiveFeetofFury blog. Her views on Islam, political correctness, freedom of speech, and other issues ignited controversy.

Literary career
Born in Hamilton, Ontario, Shaidle studied at Sheridan College. Beginning in the mid-1980s she worked in Toronto, eventually taking up a post at the Catholic New Times magazine. In 1991, she left the publication to write full-time on government grants, only to discover a few weeks later that she had developed lupus erythematosus. Her four-year illness provided the subject matter for her 1998 essay collection God Rides a Yamaha.

In the early 1990s, Shaidle published two poetry chapbooks with the Toronto indie press Lowlife Publishing, which also published works by Lynn Crosbie and Maggie Helwig. Her book-length poetry collection, Lobotomy Magnificat, was nominated for a 1998 Governor General's Award. Critic Wendy McGrath, writing in the Edmonton Journal, praised the poetry for how it "effectively relates sacred images or text to present day events and images." In contrast, the Montreal Gazette'''s reviewer was critical of the book's "diet of smart phrasing... and fabricated insights."

 Blogging 
Shaidle wrote the blog Relapsed Catholic (2000–2007) and a column for the Catholic weekly Our Sunday Visitor.  She left the latter post in April 2007 after the newspaper refused to publish a column she had written criticizing Earth Day. In September 2007 she began a new blog, Five Feet of Fury, a reference to her petite stature and combative writing style. After the 2011 Norway attacks, she wrote "‘Anders Breivik stole the counterjihad movement from freedom fighters. We’re stealing it back’". Shaidle also guest hosted and moderated the popular Canadian conservative blog, Small Dead Animals.

Defamation
In 2008, human rights lawyer Richard Warman sued Shaidle, Ezra Levant, Kate McMillan of Small Dead Animals and the National Post over links to comments criticizing him at a Canadian internet forum, freedominion.ca. The National Post settled with Warman soon after the suit was launched and, in June 2015, Shaidle, Levant and McMillan all settled in exchange for undisclosed amounts and the issuance of public retractions and apologies.

Other work
Also in 2008 Shaidle and journalist Pete Vere wrote and published The Tyranny of Nice, a critique of the Canadian human rights tribunals. Shaidle's writing also appeared in outlets such as FrontPage Magazine, Pajamas Media, Examiner.com and Taki's Magazine. She appeared on the Michael Coren Show, The Agenda (on TVO), the Charles Adler Show, The Political Cesspool, Vatican Radio, MSNBC, and Pajamas Media Radio. She was also on the board of advisors of the International Free Press Society.

 Awards and recognition 
 1998: poetry finalist, Governor General's Awards
 Canadian Church Press: four awards (humour, best national columnist, etc.)

Bibliography
 Poetry 
 Gas Stations of the Cross. Toronto: Lowlife Publishing, 1990.
 Round Up the Usual Suspects: More poems about famous dead people. Toronto: Lowlife Publishing, 1992.Lobotomy magnificat, Ottawa: Oberon, 1997.  (hardcover),  (paperback).

 Essays 
 God Rides a Yamaha: Musings on pain, poetry, and pop culture., Northstone, 1998. .
 A Seeker's Dozen: The 12 Steps for Everyone Else. CafePress, 2004. CafePress product number 10267680.
 A Catholic Alphabet: The Faith from A to Z. CafePress, 2005. CafePress product number 17385236.
 Acoustic Ladyland: Kathy Shaidle Unplugged. Lulu, 2007. Digital download only.

 Nonfiction 
 The Tyranny of Nice'' (co-authored with Pete Vere). Interim Publishing, 2008. .

References

External links
Audio: Shire Network News Interview with Kathy Shaidle and Kate McMillan of Small Dead Animals about the Warman lawsuit.
Free Press report re London ON speaking engagement, News report on London speaking engagement.

1964 births
2021 deaths
20th-century Canadian poets
Canadian bloggers
Canadian women bloggers
Canadian social commentators
Canadian women columnists
Canadian columnists
Canadian women poets
Counter-jihad activists
Journalists from Ontario
Writers from Hamilton, Ontario
Roman Catholic writers
Writers from Toronto
Canadian Roman Catholics
Sheridan College alumni
Canadian women journalists
20th-century Canadian women writers
Canadian critics of Islam
Deaths from ovarian cancer
Deaths from cancer in Ontario
Christian critics of Islam